The Wych Elm cultivar  Ulmus glabra 'Gittisham' was cloned from an old tree found in the village of Gittisham, Devon.

Description
Indistinguishable from the species.

Pests and diseases
Although promoted as 'resistant', 'Gittisham' was found to be very susceptible to Dutch elm disease in trials conducted by Irstea at le Pepiniere de l'Etat, Guemene-Penfao, France, in 2012.

Accessions
None known.

References

Wych elm cultivar
Ulmus articles missing images
Ulmus